Márcia Martins Alves (20 January 1964 – 10 November 2017), known professionally as Márcia Cabrita, was a Brazilian film, television and theater actress known mostly for her comedic roles.

Biography
Márcia Martins Alves was born in Niterói on January 20, 1964, to a family of Portuguese descent, being the second of two sisters. She took acting lessons during her youth, and made her debut in television in 1992, on Rede Globo's miniseries As Noivas de Copacabana. In 1997 she made her breakthrough as the maid Neide Aparecida in the sitcom Sai de Baixo, but left the series in 2000 after getting pregnant with her daughter.

After a one-year break, she returned to television in 2001, acting in series such as Brava Gente and telenovelas such as Desejos de Mulher and Sete Pecados. In 2004 she debuted as a film actress on Xuxa Meneghel's Xuxa e o Tesouro da Cidade Perdida; they collaborated again on 2006's Xuxa Gêmeas. In 2010 she was diagnosed with ovarian cancer, but continued to act until 2017, when her health worsened.

Cabrita's final role prior to her death was in the telenovela Novo Mundo, as the wife of José Bonifácio de Andrada, Narcisa Emília O'Leary. With her health further declining, she was forced to leave the telenovela, but was scheduled to return to its final episode. This, however, never happened; she died on November 10, 2017, aged 53.

Personal life
From 2000 until their divorce in 2004 Cabrita was married to psychoanalyst Ricardo Parente, with whom she had a daughter, Manuela.

Filmography

Television

References

External links
 

1964 births
2017 deaths
Brazilian film actresses
Brazilian television actresses
20th-century Brazilian actresses
21st-century Brazilian actresses
People from Niterói
Actresses from Rio de Janeiro (city)
Brazilian telenovela actresses
Brazilian people of Portuguese descent
Deaths from ovarian cancer
Deaths from cancer in Rio de Janeiro (state)